Kraabel is an English surname, and may refer to:
 A. Thomas Kraabel (1934–2016), an American classics scholar and educator
 Anton Kraabel (1862–1934), a North Dakota Republican Party politician
 Caroline Kraabel (born 1961), an American composer, improviser and saxophonist
 Paul Kraabel (1933–2016), American politician 

English-language surnames